The Society for Human Resource Management (SHRM) is a professional human resources membership association headquartered in Alexandria, Virginia. SHRM promotes the role of HR as a profession and provides education, certification, and networking to its members, while lobbying Congress on issues pertinent to labor management.

History
Founded in 1948 as the American Society for Personnel Administration (ASPA), the organization operated on a volunteer basis until 1964, when it established headquarters in Berea, Ohio, and began hiring staff members. In 1984, the headquarters was moved to Alexandria, Virginia, and in 1989, the organization changed its name to the Society for Human Resource Management.

The association has more than 575 chapters worldwide, more than 400 staff members and more than 300,000 members in 165 countries. The president and chief executive officer is Johnny C. Taylor Jr.

Research
The organization's Survey Research Center researches workplace issues and their implications for the HR professional and business leaders. Among its products are the annual Employee Benefits Survey and Employee Job Satisfaction and Engagement Survey and the monthly Leading Indicators of National Employment (LINE) report.  SHRM conducts research for organizations.

In 2019, SHRM released its report, "The High Cost of a Toxic Workplace Culture". The company polled American employees in order to determine the impact of culture on workers’ well-being and business’ financial health. According to the report, 20% of employees left their jobs between 2014 and 2019 because of toxic workplace cultures. Partly to combat these issues, SHRM designed its People Manager Qualification learning and development program.

On February 16, 2022, SHRM presented the report ''State of the Workplace Study'', which includes a look back at U.S. workplaces and gauges what went well and where organizations struggled throughout 2021, and it also includes a look at future trends in U.S. workplaces.

Conferences
SHRM holds annual conferences and regional student conferences. The individual state conferences are organized by SHRM's State Councils.

Lobbying activity
SHRM lobbies governmental bodies regarding workplace law and industry practice. For example, in April 2008, SHRM announced in a press release that its representatives had appeared before the US Senate to petition for changes in the administration of the Family and Medical Leave Act.

The organization announced in the November 2003 issue of its HR Magazine that it had submitted a position paper to the Equal Employment Opportunity Commission suggesting factors the agency should consider when determining how to amend the definition of the term "job applicant" for the purposes of record keeping required by companies in order to comply with affirmative action and anti-discrimination laws.

In 2003, SHRM conducted an e-mail survey of its members to gauge the effectiveness of the Equal Employment Opportunity Commission (EEOC)  It presented the results of this survey to the EEOC at a meeting on September 8, 2003.

In November 2006, the Office of Disability Employment Policy (ODEP) of the U.S. Department of Labor established an alliance with SHRM to encourage and promote the employment of people with disabilities.

In 2015 and 2016, SHRM worked to oppose the United States Department of Labor's Fair Labor Standards Overtime regulation. The rule greatly increases the salary under which employees are eligible for overtime and the number of the employees who qualify for it.

COVID-19 pandemic 

In May 2020, SHRM joined with branded content studio Heve to produce a commercial targeted at SHRM employees and the American workforce at large. SHRM president and CEO, Johnny C. Taylor Jr., was featured in the video. The commercial was entirely self-shot from actors’ homes. Its focus was on reassuring everyone that SHRM would continue supporting employees and companies.

Products and services 
SHRM offers two membership options: SHRM Professional Membership and SHRM Global Online Membership. This first is available to U.S.-based and global professionals, the second only to professionals outside the U.S. Members have access to HR news, document samples and templates, compliance resources, community chats, and advisors.

The society also offers two main certifications: the SHRM Certified Professional Certification and the SHRM Senior Certified Professional Certification.

See also 
 List of human resource management associations

References

External links
 

1948 establishments in the United States
Professional associations based in the United States
Organizations established in 1948
Human resource management associations
Lobbying firms
Organizations based in Alexandria, Virginia
Human resource management
Professional networks